At the Railway accident near Halfweg on  2. November 1966, an electric multiple unit derailed near Halfweg in North Holland.

History 
On 2. November 1966 derailed ElD4 521 (NS Mat '64) as part of train No 1018 near Halfweg. The train had sped over a switch and derailed. This led to damages in all cars. After the derailment the leading unit Bk1 came to a standstill beside the track, the BD carriage stood complete beside the track, while the AB- and the other motor unit Bk2 landed on their sides in a ditch. On 7 November 1966 the train arrived for repairs at Revisiebedrijf Haarlem. It was returned to service on 24 July 1967. The opportunity was used to undertake also a small revision (H2).

See also 
 Railway accident near Halfweg (1972)

References

External links 

 Peter van Zoest: Een gewonde treinpassagier wordt weggedragen langs de spoordijk.
 Peter van Zoest: De wagons van het moderne treinstel (TT, modele 64) langs de spoordijk. Een van de railstaven staat als een hoefijzer omhoog.
 Andre van der Heuvel: Een ANP-luchtfoto van twee ontspoorde wagons van het treinstel. Duidelijk is te zien hoe een van de wagons bijna haaks op de spoorbaan is gekomen en zich in de grond heeft geboord.
 Andre van der Heuvel: Een ANP-luchtfoto van twee ontspoorde wagons van het treinstel. Duidelijk is te zien hoe een van de wagons bijna haaks op de spoorbaan is gekomen en zich in de grond heeft geboord.

Derailments in the Netherlands
History of North Holland
Haarlemmermeer
Railway accidents in 1966